Intense Live Series, Vol. 2 (also known as Recorded Live, Vol. 2) is the first live album by the American Christian metal band Tourniquet. It was released on Intense Records in February 1993. It contains live recordings of material from the band's previous three studio albums, Stop the Bleeding (1990), Psycho Surgery (1991), and Pathogenic Ocular Dissonance (1992), as well as covers of "The Tempter" from Trouble's Psalm 9 album and "The Messiah" from Bloodgood's Detonation album. Les Carlsen, Bloodgood's vocalist, was a special guest vocalist since Tourniquet vocalist Guy Ritter departed from the band prior to the recording of this album. Victor Macias, Gary Lenaire, and Erik Mendez also perform vocals. Session notes by Terry Taylor, the album's executive producer, and a biography of Tourniquet are included in the booklet. Intense Live Series, Vol. 2 was later included as part of the Intense Live Series compilation, which also contained Vol. 1 by Deliverance and Vol. 4 by Die Happy, and released on KMG Records in 1998.

Track listing

 appears on Pathogenic Ocular Dissonance (Metal Blade Records version (1993) and Collector's Edition remaster (2020))

Personnel

Tourniquet
Ted Kirkpatrick - drums, percussion
Gary Lenaire - lead guitar, rhythm guitar, vocals
Erik Mendez - lead guitar, rhythm guitar, vocals
Victor Macias - bass guitar, vocals

Guest musician
Les Carlsen (Bloodgood) - vocals

Additional personnel
Executive producer: Terry Taylor
Engineered by Gene Eugene
Recorded January 9 and 10, 1993 at The Green Room, California
Mixed January 17 and 18, 1993 at Mixing Lab A, Garden Grove, California
Mastered by Doug Doyle at Digital Brothers, California
Art direction: Brian Godawa
Design: Joe Potter
A&R direction: Matthew Duffy

References

External links
Intense Live Series, Vol. 2 at Tourniquet.net

Tourniquet (band) albums
1993 live albums
Live thrash metal albums